Reedy River Falls Historic Park and Greenway, now known as Falls Park, runs along both banks of Reedy River from the falls to Church Street, in Greenville, South Carolina.

History
Before the arrival of Europeans, Cherokees settled the area around the Reedy River.  The first white settlements occurred in 1777, and the city of Greenville grew around the river when mills harnessed its power.  Evidence of the mills can still be seen along the river today. Furman University built a campus nearby in 1850.

Reedy River Falls Preservation
In 1907 the first idea of turning Reedy River Falls into a park was introduced. This idea had been ruined when the city began to become industrialized. Industries and even individuals used the river as a dump for waste and trash. The actual pollution hadn't ceased until the 1960s. Furman donated the land needed to set aside to begin Reedy River Falls Historic Park and Greenway. It was listed on the National Register of Historic Places in 1973.

The development of Falls Park began in the 1990s when a developer proposed the concept of turning the park into a regional attraction. The development of the park began with a budget of 13,000,000 and was funded through the City of Greenville Hospitality Tax.

Description of Falls Park
Falls Park is located right in the center of Greenville County. This area has become known as Downtown Greenville and is a huge attraction with its citizens. The area today is filled with thousands of stores and restaurants. The park now includes a bridge known as Liberty Bridge and brings together many different types of greenery and benches, and different trails throughout the park.

See also
Reedy River Industrial District

References

External links

 Falls Park - official site

Parks on the National Register of Historic Places in South Carolina
Tourist attractions in Greenville, South Carolina
National Register of Historic Places in Greenville, South Carolina
Parks in South Carolina
Protected areas of Greenville County, South Carolina